The Women's team sprint at the 2013 UCI Track Cycling World Championships was held on February 20. 9 nations of 2 cyclists each participated in the contest. After the qualifying, the fastest 2 teams raced for gold, and 3rd and 4th teams raced for bronze.

Medalists

Results

Qualifying 
The qualifying was held at 19:00.

Finals 
The finals were held at 21:10.

Small Final

Final

References 

2013 UCI Track Cycling World Championships
UCI Track Cycling World Championships – Women's team sprint
UCI